The Australian cricket team had a short tour of Sri Lanka during the 1982-83 season. The two countries played their first ever Test together, which Australia won. Sri Lanka defeated Australia in the rain affected ODI series 2-0.

Squad
The squad was announced in March 1983. Regular players Rod Marsh, Jeff Thomson, Geoff Lawson and Kim Hughes elected not to tour. Australia picked the following squad:
Batsmen - Greg Chappell (captain), David Hookes (vice-captain), Graeme Wood, Kepler Wessels, Allan Border,  Graham Yallop, Steve Smith
Fast bowlers - Dennis Lillee, Rodney Hogg, John Maguire
Spinners - Bruce Yardley, Tom Hogan
Wicketkeeper - Roger Woolley
Manager - Basil Rigg
Five of the players had not toured for Australia before: Smith, Maguire, Hogan, Wessels and Woolley. Woolley was chosen over two other Sheffield Shield wicketkeepers who had represented Australia in Test cricket, Kevin Wright and Steve Rixon. John Dyson, who had been an Australian regular over the home summer, was a surprise omission. Graham Yallop earned an international recall after a very strong domestic season. Tom Hogan was considered a surprise selection.

Test series

Only Test

One Day Internationals (ODIs)

Sri Lanka won the series 2-0.

1st ODI

2nd ODI

3rd ODI

4th ODI

References

External links
Series home
Australian cricket team in Sri Lanka 1982-83  at CricketArchive
Australian cricket team in Sri Lanka in 1982-83 at Test Cricket Tours
Tour report at Wisden

1982-83
1983 in Australian cricket
1983 in Sri Lankan cricket
Sri Lankan cricket seasons from 1972–73 to 1999–2000
International cricket competitions from 1980–81 to 1985